Bear Butte Creek is a stream in the U.S. state of South Dakota.

The creek takes its name from Bear Butte.

See also
List of rivers of South Dakota

References

Rivers of Lawrence County, South Dakota
Rivers of Meade County, South Dakota
Rivers of South Dakota